Brenda Taylor (born October 28, 1962 in Nanaimo, British Columbia) is a Canadian rower. She won two gold medals at the 1992 Summer Olympics in Barcelona, in coxless four and in coxed eight. She has been inducted into the Canada's Sports Hall of Fame.

References 

1962 births
Living people
Canadian female rowers
Olympic rowers of Canada
Olympic gold medalists for Canada
Rowers at the 1992 Summer Olympics
Olympic medalists in rowing
Medalists at the 1992 Summer Olympics
Sportspeople from Nanaimo
Commonwealth Games medallists in rowing
Commonwealth Games bronze medallists for Canada
Rowers at the 1986 Commonwealth Games
Medallists at the 1986 Commonwealth Games